Speak & Spell is the debut studio album by English electronic music band Depeche Mode. It was released on 5 October 1981, or possibly 29 October 1981, by Mute Records. It was the band's only album to feature Vince Clarke, and is much lighter in tone than their subsequent releases.

The album peaked at number 10 on the UK Albums Chart, and was ranked number 991 in the 2000 book All Time Top 1000 Albums.

Background
This was the only Depeche Mode album with Vince Clarke as a member. Clarke wrote most of the songs for the band, before departing to form Yazoo and later Erasure.

The album is significantly lighter in tone and melody than their later work, a direction which can largely be attributed to Clarke's writing. After he left, Martin Gore took over songwriting duties, writing almost all of the band's material. Later albums written by him would explore darker subjects and melodies.

When interviewed by Simon Amstell for Channel 4's Popworld programme in 2005, Gore and Fletcher both stated that the track "What's Your Name?" was their least favourite Depeche Mode song of all time.

Critical reception

Upon its release, Speak & Spell received generally positive reception from critics. Record Mirror praised Depeche Mode's smart simplicity and noted the album offers "much to admire and little to disappoint." Reviewer Sunie commented that the band's chief skill "lies in making their art sound artless; simple synthesiser melodies, Gahan's tuneful but undramatic singing and a matter-of-fact, gimmick-free production all help achieve this unforced effect." As a whole she describes it as "a charming, cheeky collection of compulsive dance tunes". Mike Stand of Smash Hits wrote: "Synthesisers and bubblegum go together like tinned peaches and Carnation, hence [Depeche Mode's] hit singles: melody, uncluttered electronics and nice voices in humanising harmony." Paul Morley of the New Musical Express described the album as "generous, silly, susceptible electro-tickled pop... that despite its relentless friskiness and unprincipled cheerfulness is encouraging not exasperating", noting the music's "diverting vitality", and concluding that "Depeche Mode, apparently, could quickly move... far up and away from constructing slightly sarcastic jingles."

Paul Colbert of Melody Maker felt that Depeche Mode speak with "a winning immediacy" and called the album "a wriggling giant of motivation, persuading each muscle to jump in time with the music", while at the same time criticising the presence of certain tracks such as "Nodisco" that "repeat earlier thoughts and feels without adding fresh views." Rob White, writing for the Christchurch Press, was less positive, calling the music on Speak & Spell "instant pop, instantly disposable, as precious as the gladwrapped swan on the... cover", remarking that the songs "would actually blow away in the wind... if it wasn't for their ability to chance upon melody hooks that drag you along without any real protest" and ultimately calling the album "tedious". The Village Voices Robert Christgau dismissed the bulk of the album as "tuneful pap" that "crosses Meco (without the humble functionalism), Gary Numan (without the devotion to surface), and Kraftwerk (without the humor—oh, definitely without the humor)."

In a retrospective review for AllMusic, Ned Raggett described Speak & Spell as "at once both a conservative, functional pop record and a groundbreaking release", as well as "an undiluted joy." Nitsuh Abebe of Pitchfork said that the album endures "not as stylish futurism (not anymore) but as the happy noises of teenagers who believed it to be stylish futurism—and with a charming earnestness." In January 2005, Speak & Spell was included as an "essential" album in Mojo magazine's "Depeche Mode + the Story of Electro-Pop" special edition.

2006 re-release
The album was re-released on 3 April 2006 (along with Music for the Masses and Violator) as part of Mute's extensive Depeche Mode reissue schedule. This special edition release was a double disc set that included a Hybrid SACD/CD and a DVD. This format included the album in five formats—multi-channel SACD, stereo SACD, PCM stereo CD, DTS 5.1 and Dolby Digital 5.1.

In the United States, the album was not re-released until 2 June 2006. The US version was only a CD rather than a SACD/CD Hybrid, though it still included the DVD which was identical to the European one (barring some different copyrights and logos).

The re-release somewhat preserves the album as it was originally intended. As such, while it is mostly the same as the UK version, North America got a completely new version with some songs that have never been released there. For example, "New Life" was the original version, not a remix, and "I Sometimes Wish I Was Dead" finally debuted (on a Depeche Mode release) in North America. However, "Dreaming of Me", the band's very first single which was not on the original album, was included at the end. The four bonus tracks on the original CD release in the UK, were omitted from the re-issued CD, but were on the DVD.

Also included was a 28-minute documentary about the making of the album entitled Depeche Mode: 1980–1981 (Do We Really Have to Give Up Our Day Jobs?) featuring interviews with the group (including Vince Clarke) and other relevant personnel such as Daniel Miller. There is various footage of the group's appearances on Top of the Pops including their very first appearance from 1981 performing "New Life". There is also vintage BBC footage of the Speak & Spell Tour from the same year.

The remastered album was released on limited-edition vinyl in March 2007.

Track listing

 The song "Dreaming of Me" (Fade Out Version) replaces "I Sometimes Wish I Was Dead" on the original German LP and CD releases.

 "Shout!" (from the B-side of the "New Life" single) is listed on the CD and all subsequent releases as "Shout", without the exclamation mark.
 The versions of "Dreaming of Me" and "Ice Machine" included on this CD have cold ends, similarly to the original 7-inch single (as opposed to the fading-out versions on the original US album and CD single reissue).

US LP and CD

2006 Collectors Edition (CD + DVD)
 Disc one is a hybrid SACD/CD with a multi-channel SACD layer.
 Disc two is a DVD which includes Speak & Spell in DTS 5.1, Dolby Digital 5.1 and PCM Stereo plus bonus material.

Personnel
Credits adapted from the liner notes of Speak & Spell.

 Depeche Mode – synthetics, voices, production
 Vince Clarke
 Andy Fletcher
 Dave Gahan
 Martin Gore
 Daniel Miller – production
 Eric Radcliffe – engineering
 John Fryer – engineering
 Brian Griffin – photography

Charts

Weekly charts

Year-end charts

Certifications

Notes

References

Bibliography

External links

 Album information from the official Depeche Mode website
 Official remaster info

1981 debut albums
Albums produced by Daniel Miller (music producer)
Albums produced by Vince Clarke
Depeche Mode albums
Mute Records albums
Sire Records albums